Air Chief Marshal Sir Thomas Neville Stack  (19 October 1919 – 26 January 1994) was a senior Royal Air Force commander.

Early life
Stack was born on 19 October 1919, the son of aviation pioneer T. Neville Stack. He joined the Royal Air Force in 1935 as a flight cadet at RAF College Cranwell. He gained a permanent commission on 29 July 1939 and passed out of the college with the Sword of Honour. He spent his war service with Coastal Command serving on flying boats until transferring to Transport Command in the late 1950s including a tour as Deputy Captain of the Queen's Flight.

Air Staff officer
In 1967 Stack became commandant of the RAF College Cranwell before moving on in 1970 as a representative with CENTO. In December 1972 he was appointed as Air Officer Commanding-in-Chief of Training Command then moved in the same role at RAF Strike Command. Between 1976 and 1978 he was Air ADC to the Queen. From February 1976 he was Air Secretary before he retired at his own request in 1978.

Civil life
On retirement from the air force, Stack became a Gentleman Usher to the Queen and from 1989 Extra Gentleman Usher. He also became a Freeman of the City of London. Stack died in London on 26 January 1994, aged 74.

Notes

|-

1919 births
1994 deaths
Royal Air Force air marshals
Graduates of the Royal Air Force College Cranwell
Knights Commander of the Order of the Bath
Commanders of the Order of the British Empire
Commanders of the Royal Victorian Order
Recipients of the Air Force Cross (United Kingdom)
Recipients of the Croix de guerre (Belgium)
Gentlemen Ushers
Commandants of the Royal Air Force College Cranwell